Allincapac, Allin Ccapac or Allin Japac (possibly from Quechua: allin good, qhapaq the mighty one) is a mountain in the Andes of Peru. Allincapac is located in the Puno Region, Carabaya Province, Macusani District, south of Huaynaccapac, northeast of Chichicapac and north of Lake Chaupicocha.

References

Mountains of Peru
Mountains of Puno Region